James Brantley (born 1945) is an American artist known for his painting.

Biography
Brantley was born in 1945 in Philadelphia, Pennsylvania. He studied at the Pennsylvania Academy of Fine Arts, the Philadelphia College of Art, and the University of Pennsylvania.

His work is in the Petrucci Family Foundation Collection of African American Art, the Pennsylvania Academy of the Fine Arts, and the Philadelphia Museum of Art.

His work was included in the 2011 exhibition The Chemistry of Color: The Sorgenti Collection of Contemporary African-American Art at the Hudson River Museum and the 2015 exhibition We Speak: Black Artists in Philadelphia, 1920s-1970s at the Woodmere Art Museum.

References

External links
 James Brantley discusses his career and art at the Brandywine Workshop and Archives in 2011

1945 births
Living people
American male artists
Artists from Philadelphia